Sweet Home 3D is a free architectural design software that helps users create a 2D plan of a house, with a 3D preview, and decorate exterior and interior views, including ability to place furniture and home appliances. In Sweet Home 3D, furniture can be imported and arranged to create a virtual environment. It can also be used for designing blueprints of houses.

Features
 Import home blueprint from scanned image
 Export to PDF, SVG, and obj

Gallery

References

External links 

 http://www.sweethome3d.com/
 https://sourceforge.net/projects/sweethome3d/

Free software programmed in Java (programming language)
Free computer-aided design software